Ponceau 3R (C.I. 16155) is an azo dye that once was used as a red food colorant.  It is one of a family of Ponceau (French for "poppy-colored") dyes.

References 

Food colorings
Azo dyes
Organic sodium salts
Naphthalenesulfonates
2-Naphthols